Enrico Cassi (December 1863 – 12 February 1913) was an Italian sculptor.

Biography

He was born in Varese. His father was a marble worker in Pavia, was able to have Enrico study sculpting at the Brera Academy under Francesco Barzaghi and Enrico Butti. In 1891, at the Triennale of the Brera, he received praise for his sculpture titled Emigrata. In 1894, paradoxically, his sculpture titled War won a national award from the Society of the Peace. He completed for a site at Porta Venezia in Milan, the Monument to Luciano Manara, left incomplete by Barzaghi. He also completed a Monument to General Dezza for Milan. In 1909, he completed the monument to the Cairoli family in Pavia. He is also known for his works in the Cimitero Monumentale of Milan, including the tomb monument of the Daninos family.

References

1865 births
1913 deaths
19th-century Italian sculptors
20th-century Italian sculptors
Italian male sculptors
Brera Academy alumni